The 1856 United States presidential election in the New Hampshire took place on November 4, 1856 as part of the 1856 United States presidential election.  Voters chose five representatives, or electors to the Electoral College, who voted for President and Vice President.

New Hampshire was won by former California Senator John C. Frémont, who won the state by a narrow vote margin of less than 6,000 votes. He then lost nationally to former United States Minister to the United Kingdom James Buchanan.

Results

See also
 United States presidential elections in New Hampshire

References

New Hampshire
1856
1856 New Hampshire elections